The Asian hornet (Vespa velutina), also known as the yellow-legged hornet or Asian predatory wasp, is a species of hornet indigenous to Southeast Asia.
It is of concern as an invasive species in some other countries.

Appearance
Vespa velutina is slightly smaller than the European hornet. Typically, queens are 30 mm (1.2 in) in length, and males about 24 mm (0.95 in). Workers measure about 20 mm (0.80 in) in length. The species has distinctive yellow tarsi (legs). The thorax is a velvety brown or black with a brown abdomen. Each abdominal segment has a narrow posterior yellow border, except for the fourth segment, which is orange. The head is black and the face yellow. Regional forms vary sufficiently in color to cause difficulties in classification, and several subspecies have been variously identified and ultimately rejected; while a history of recognizing subspecies within many of the Vespa species exists, including V. velutina, the most recent taxonomic revision of the genus treats all subspecific names in the genus Vespa as synonyms, effectively relegating them to no more than informal names for regional color forms. The color form causing concern about its invasiveness in Europe has been referred to as V. v. nigrithorax, though this name no longer has any taxonomic standing.

Biology
Like other hornets, V. velutina builds nests that may house colonies of several thousand individuals. Females in the colony are armed with formidable stingers with which they defend their nests and kill their prey. The nest is of paper, roughly in the shape of a huge egg, usually at least half a meter long. Unlike the nest of the European hornet (V. crabro), its exit is usually lateral rather than at the bottom. The nesting season is long, and a colony commonly begins by building a nest in a low shrub, then abandoning it after some months and rapidly building a new one high in a tree, possibly as an antiparasitic measure. The next generation of young queens disperses in the late autumn to hibernate over winter.

V. velutina opportunistically hunts a very wide range of insects, including flies, dragonflies, and Orthoptera, typically capturing them by pursuit.

Predation on honeybees
The major concern about their invasiveness, however, is that when they find a honey bee colony or an apiary, they tend to settle down and specialize in honey bees as their prey, as do the larger Japanese giant hornets. A hornet occupies a position above a beehive as its hunting territory. It flies about within an area of about half a square metre, scanning the direction from which foraging honey bees return to the hive. Each hornet vigorously defends its hunting territory, chasing off any rivals. However, as soon as it catches a bee, it flies off and another hornet replaces it, usually within a few seconds. The circadian activities of the two species are similar, and the hunting hornets match them; their most intense activity is in the morning and afternoon, not near dusk or noon.

In its native range, V. velutina mainly hunts Apis cerana, the eastern honey bee, which has evolved a strategy of avoiding hovering hornets by rapid entry and exit from the hive when hornets are about. The guard bees also ball hornets to death. However, where A. mellifera, the western honey bee, has been imported, V. velutina finds them easier prey than A. cerana, because A. mellifera has not been subjected to selection for countering concentrated hawking by hornets. For example, A. mellifera approach their hives more indirectly and slowly when they detect hawking hornets, instead of darting in as fast as possible in the way that A. cerana does. They also ball hornets, but less effectively, and they do not achieve as high a temperature in the ball. Furthermore, when they detect that hornets are hawking, A. cerana tend to withdraw into the nest, but A. mellifera do not.

A. cerana guard bees also use wing shimmering in response to the presence of V. velutina. This has variously been suggested to be an aposematic signal or a strategy for disruption of visual patterns, similar to the behavior of Apis cerana nuluensis and Apis dorsata. But instead has been shown, in conjunction with rocking, to be endothermic heat production in preparation for a ball attack on the hornet. Whilst A. mellifera, also ball attack hornets, they exhibit no such endothermic heat production behavior, and when A. mellifera occurs together with A. cerana, the hornet V. velutina preferentially hawks A. mellifera foragers.

Distribution

V. velutina originates from Southeast Asia, particularly the tropical regions, from northern India, Pakistan, Afghanistan, Bhutan, China, Taiwan, Burma, Thailand, Laos, Vietnam, Malaysia, the Indo-Chinese peninsula, and surrounding archipelagoes.

Pest status and invasiveness
As an invasive species, the Asian hornet appeared earliest in France, Spain, Portugal, South Korea, and Japan. Further invasions are ongoing in various countries, including much of Europe. Humans have been attacked after disturbing hornets; although the species is not aggressive, it "charges in a group as soon as it feels its nest is threatened". People have been hospitalised in France after suffering anaphylactic shock as a result of multiple stings. Because of Asian hornets' larger size, their stings are more serious than those of western honey bees. In November 2017, a man was killed in Galicia, Spain after being stung over 20 times while pruning an apple tree. Several people have died in south west France near the original introduction site, including a resident of Chaillevette, Charente-Maritime, a 60-year-old woman in Gironde, Nouvelle-Aquitaine in 2019, and a farmer in Orival, Charente in 2020. There were nineteen confirmed Asian hornet sightings in England between 2016 and 2020, including ten nests, all of which were destroyed.

In Europe, the Asian hornet is included since 2016 in the list of Invasive Alien Species of Union concern ("the Union list"), meaning that it cannot be intentionally imported, kept, bred, transported (except for purposes of eradication), offered for sale, used or exchanged, permitted to reproduce in any way, or released into the environment, in the European Union.

Timeline
V. velutina has become an invasive species in France, where it is believed to have arrived in boxes of pottery from China in 2004. By 2009, several thousand nests were in the area of Bordeaux and surrounding departments, and by the end of 2015, they were reported over most of France.

The Asian hornet has been reported as naturalised on the Japanese island of Tsushima since about 2010.

The Asian hornet spread to northern Spain, as confirmed in 2010 by the Beekeepers' Association of the Basque Country (Gipuzkoako Erlezainen Elkartea) and the Neiker entomology institute in Irún, after breeding colonies were found. In September 2013, a beekeeper from Rasines, Cantabria, documented the hornets' presence in two specimens. In June 2015, firemen destroyed a nest in Santander.

It was first reported in Portugal in 2011.　

It was reported in Liguria, Italy in 2012. According to Italian Beekepers' Association in 2017, the Asian hornet was well established in northwestern regions of Italy, and colonization is steadily advancing.

The first sighting on the UK mainland was announced on 20 September 2016 and occurred near Tetbury in Gloucestershire; the nest was found and destroyed and no breeding adults were found within. A nest was reported on the Channel Island of Alderney in 2016.

As of October 2017, the species was reported in Belgium and then in Luxembourg in 2020,

A single "alive but dying" Asian hornet was discovered in Dublin, Ireland in 2021, but to date appears to not have become established on the island.

Biocontrol
Biocontrol of Vespa velutina has been attempted using Sarracenia purpurea - the purple pitcher plant. Pitcher plants are natural bottle traps. Both of these are invasives in France and pitchers were found to be naturally catching hornets, and so were investigated as a biocontrol. However Sarracenia purpurea has been judged too unselective to use after closer study.

Gallery

References

External links
 
 
 NNSS website for reporting sightings in Great Britain

Vespidae
Hymenoptera of Asia
Hymenoptera of Europe
Insects described in 1836
Taxa named by Amédée Louis Michel le Peletier